The abandoned 1939–40 Norgesserien would have been the 3rd season of top division football in Norway. The season was interrupted due to German occupation on April 9, 1940, during World War II.

District I

District II, Group A

District II, Group B

District III

District IV, Group A

District IV, Group B

District V, Group A

District V, Group B

District VI

District VII

District VIII

References
Norway – List of final tables (RSSSF)

Eliteserien seasons
Norway
1939 in Norwegian football
1940 in Norwegian football